Édouard Cukierman (born 1965) is a French-Israeli businessman.

Biography

Early life
Edouard Cukierman was born on 13 March 1965 in Paris. His father is Roger Cukierman, ninth president of the Conseil Représentatif des Institutions juives de France (CRIF), and Vice President of the World Jewish Congress. He settled in Israel in 1984. He served his military service at Tsahal as Réservé Officer. He graduated from the Technion - Israel Institute of Technology, where he received a B.Sc., and received a Master's in Business Administration from INSEAD.

Business career
He is the founder of Catalyst Funds and chairman of Cukierman & Co Investment House. Additionally, he is the founder of the annual Go4Europe conference and the Go4Israel event, gathering once top Chinese leaders from the business community looking to discover Israel.

Personal life
Edouard is an uncle for Amos, Avishai, Jessica, Jonathan, Raphael and Jeremie and father of three boys, Ariel, Michael and Israeli tennis player Daniel Cukierman.

Bibliography
Edouard Cukierman together with Dr. Daniel Rouach co-authored the book "Israel Valley Le bouclier technologique de l’innovation" published in June 2013 by Edition Pearson in Paris, translated into Chinese in November 2014, and in Italian in June 2016.

References 

Living people
1965 births
French emigrants to Israel
Technion – Israel Institute of Technology alumni
INSEAD alumni
Israeli businesspeople